Julius Langbehn (26 March 1851 – 30 April 1907)  was a German national Romantic art historian and philosopher. He was born in Hadersleben, Schleswig (now Haderslev in Denmark), and died in Rosenheim.

Biography
Langbehn was born in Hadersleben in what was then the Duchy of Schleswig, on 26 March 1851, the third of four sons. His father, a philologist, was dismissed from his position as the assistant principal at the local gymnasium shortly after Julius's birth, a result of a campaign to promote Danish nationalism in southern Denmark following the First Schleswig War and the Revolutions of 1848. The Langbehn family eventually settled in Kiel, where Julius entered the gymnasium in 1863. After graduation, he entered the University of Kiel for a degree in the natural sciences. At the age of 19, he enlisted in the Prussian Army following the outbreak of the Franco-Prussian War in 1870. He fought in the battles of Orleans and Le Mans in December 1870 and January 1871, respectively. Langbehn's military service left him with a profound distaste for war.

After the war, Langbehn returned to Kiel to study chemistry, though in 1872 he transferred to the University of Munich with the help of a wealthy merchant. There, he grew bored with chemistry and began to study art and archaeology. After his mother suffered a nervous breakdown, Julius traveled to Venice before returning to Munich in 1875. He studied archaeology under Heinrich Brunn; his doctoral dissertation examined early Greek statues of Nike, the goddess of victory. He worked briefly at the Imperial Archaeology Institute in Rome in 1881. Over the following decade, he traveled throughout Germany, collecting material for his first book, Rembrandt als Erzieher (Rembrandt as Teacher), published in 1890. His work was focused on initiating cultural reform in Germany.

Rembrandt als Erzieher, which was published anonymously "by a German", was a huge success. Langbehn's attitudes towards Jews was initially favourable, but as the book went through its numerous editions, this changed, with new chapters introduced to this effect in the 37th edition, which were subsequently ever more stridently revised. In 1891, he published 40 Lieder (40 Poems), again anonymously; this proved to be a complete failure. The poems, which were explicitly erotic, prompted the state prosecutor of Schleswig-Holstein to threaten to press charges. The legal problems were sufficient to force Langbehn to withdraw the book. Der Rembrandtdeutsche followed, this time "by a friend of truth", though it too was not well received. Langbehn moved to Vienna, then in the Austro-Hungarian Empire, where he lived briefly. He shortly fled the country after having been convicted in a lawsuit from his landlord. Around this time Langbehn took on a disciple, a painter from Frisia by the name of Nissen.

After departing Vienna, Langbehn traveled to Italy, southern France, Spain, and the Canary Islands in 1894. He then returned to Germany and continued his vagrant life there, producing no new works. In the mid-1890s, he began to attend Catholic churches, and in early 1900 he converted to Catholicism. He now directed his reformist tendencies toward the Catholic Church, and began to attack liberal segments. Langbehn died on 30 April 1907 of stomach cancer. He was buried in Puch near the Edignalinde at his own request because of his admiration for Edigna.

Views
Langbehn's efforts at reform were a reaction against modernism. He particularly disliked materialism, democracy, and internationalism; he favored aristocracy, individualism, and peace. He believed that Germany should abandon industrialization and urbanization in favor of an agrarian society ruled by a monarch. While Langbehn's vision did away with the bourgeois, proletarians, and the Junkers, he strongly opposed a classless society, stating that "equality is death." He was also an antisemite and an early figure in the Völkisch movement.
A widely read antisemite, Langbehn held that “A Jew can no more become a German than a plum can turn into an apple.”

Work
 Rembrandt als Erzieher (1890)
 40 Lieder von einem Deutschen (1891)
 Dürer als Führer (1928)
 Der Geist des Ganzen (1930)
 Briefe an Bischof Keppler (1937)

Notes

References

Further reading
(In German)

 Bernd Behrendt: August Julius Langbehn, der "Rembrandtdeutsche". In: Uwe Puschner, Walter Schmitz u. Justus H. Ulbricht (Hrsg.): Handbuch zur "Völkischen Bewegung" 1871-1918. Saur, München u.a. 1999. S. 94-113. 
 Bernd Behrendt: Zwischen Paradox und Paralogismus. Weltanschauliche Grundzüge einer Kulturkritik in den neunziger Jahren des. 19. Jahrhunderts am Beispiel August Julius Langbehn. Lang, Frankfurt am Main u.a. 1984. (= Europäische Hochschulschriften; Reihe 1; 804) 
 Bürger-Prinz, Hans: Über die künstlerischen Arbeiten Schizophrener In: Bumke, O. (Hrsg.): Handbuch der Geisteskrankheiten. Band IX (Spezieller Teil V: Die Schizophrenie), S.668-704. Julius Springer, Berlin 1932.
 Bürger-Prinz, Hans und A. Segelke: Julius Langbehn der Rembrandtdeutsche: Eine pathopsychologische Studie. Johann Ambrosius Barth, Leipzig 1940.
 Jörg Hobusch: Der Deutschunterricht in den Anfängen der bürgerlichen Reformpädagogik. Lang, Frankfurt am Main u.a. 1989. (= Studien zur Germanistik und Anglistik; 5) 
 Hubertus Kunert: Deutsche Reformpädagogik und Faschismus. Schroedel, Hannover u.a. 1973.
 Ulf-Thomas Lesle: Bestseller des Bürgertums und Kursbuch der Plattdeutschen: "Rembrandt als Erzieher" von August Julius Langbehn.  In: Kieler Blätter zur Volkskunde 32 (2000). S. 51-83.
 Benedikt Momme Nissen: Der Rembrandt-Deutsche Julius Langbehn. Herder, Freiburg im Breisgau 1927.
 Momme Nissen:  Des Rembrandtdeutschen und mein Weg zur Kirche, in: Joseph Eberle (Hrsg.) Unser Weg zur Kirche, Luzern 1948.
 Johannes G. Pankau: Wege zurück. Zur Entwicklungsgeschichte restaurativen Denkens im Kaiserreich. Eine Untersuchung kulturkritischer und deutschkundlicher Ideologiebildung. Lang, Frankfurt am Main u.a. 1983. (= Europäische Hochschulschriften; Reihe 1; 717) 
 Fritz Stern: Kulturpessimismus als politische Gefahr. Scherz, Bern u.a. 1963. / München. dtv. 1986.  / Stuttgart. Klett-Cotta. 2005.  (Rezension Deutschlandradio Kultur )
 Vincenzo Pinto: Apoteosi della germanicità. I sentieri di Julius Langbehn, Kulturkritiker tedesco di fine Ottocento. Icaro, Lecce 2009.

External links
 
 

1851 births
1907 deaths
People from Haderslev Municipality
German art historians
German male non-fiction writers
Ludwig Maximilian University of Munich alumni